Kevin Johnson Jr. (September 23, 1985 – November 29, 2022) was an American man executed in Missouri for the 2005 murder of police officer William McEntee. Johnson's case has partly drawn attention because his daughter, Khorry Ramney, was not allowed to witness her father's execution due to her age (19), the same age Johnson was when he committed the crime for which he was sentenced to death. Indeed, a law in Missouri prohibited people under the age of 21 from attending an execution.

Murder
On July 5, 2005, police officers including William McEntee were looking for Kevin Johnson for an alleged breach of his probation. While searching Johnson's house, his 12-year-old brother, "Bam Bam", began having a seizure. According to Johnson, police blocked Johnson's family from providing him with sufficient medical treatment, and he eventually died in hospital. Johnson therefore blamed the police, believing that they were indirectely responsible for the death of his little brother. Later that evening, one of those officers, Sgt. William McEntee, 43, returned to Meacham Park. He had offered to take a fireworks complaint from another officer because he was closer to the area. Suddenly, Johnson opened fire on McEntee, hitting him multiple times. McEntee drove a short distance, crashed, and fell out of the car. Johnson walked over and shot him again. McEntee later died in hospital.

Execution
Johnson's lawyers claimed racism played a role in his death sentence, as Johnson was black, and McEntee was white. Additionally, the prosecutor who sought the death penalty against Johnson, Bob McCulloch, requested the death penalty in the police officer murder cases where the defendants were black but did not do so for the only white defendant. The courts rejected the defense and declined to halt the execution. 

Johnson's daughter, 19-year-old Khorry Ramey, asked the courts to allow her to witness her father's execution. Her request was denied, however, after a judge upheld a law that stated Ramey was too young. Missouri law requires a person to be aged 21 or older in order to view an execution.

Johnson was executed on November 29, 2022, via lethal injection. In his final statement, he apologized to McEntee's family as well as his own. In a first in Missouri execution history, Johnson was accompanied by his spiritual adviser during the execution procedure.

See also
 Capital punishment in Missouri
 Capital punishment in the United States
 List of people executed in Missouri
 List of people executed in the United States in 2022

References

1985 births
2022 deaths
21st-century American criminals
21st-century executions by Missouri
American male criminals
American people executed for murdering police officers
People convicted of murder by Missouri
People executed by Missouri by lethal injection